Zubák is a village and municipality in Púchov District in the Trenčín Region of north-western Slovakia.

History
In historical records the village was first mentioned in 1471.

Geography
The municipality lies at an altitude of 430 metres and covers an area of 25.666 km². It has a population of about 923 people.

External links
 
 
https://web.archive.org/web/20071217080336/http://www.statistics.sk/mosmis/eng/run.html 

Villages and municipalities in Púchov District